John Richard Hegley (born 1 October 1953) is an English performance poet, comedian, musician and songwriter.

Early life
He was born in the Newington Green area of Islington, London, England, into a Roman Catholic household. He was brought up in Luton and later Bristol, where he attended Rodway School.  After school he worked as a bus conductor and civil servant before attending the University of Bradford, where he gained a BSc in European Literature and the History of Ideas and Sociology. Hegley has French ancestry (his father's name was René) and claims he is descended from the composer Jean-Philippe Rameau. His paternal grandmother was a dancer with the Folies Bergère.

Career
Hegley began his performing career at London's Comedy Store in 1980, and toured as one half of The Brown Paper Bag Brothers with Otiz Cannelloni. He received national exposure when he appeared with his backing band the Popticians on Carrott's Lib in 1983, and recorded two sessions for John Peel in 1983 and 1984. Hegley published his first poetry collection, Visions of the Bone Idol (Poems about Dogs and Glasses), pieces from which were later incorporated into Glad to Wear Glasses, in 1984. Hegley has written a number of collections of poetry, ranging from the surreal through the humorous to the personal and emotional.  There are a number of recurring themes in his poems, notably glasses, dogs and reminiscences of his childhood in Luton.

He was presenter of the Border Television series Word of Mouth – in which numerous contemporary poets performed their work – in 1990, and the BBC radio series Hearing with Hegley from 1996 to 1999.  His other television appearances include Wogan and Never Mind the Buzzcocks. In 1998, Hegley's poem "Malcolm" came second in a BBC survey to find Britain's most popular comic poem. In 1999 he starred in a Simon Callow-directed revival of the musical The Pajama Game in London's West End.

In September 1999 together with Simon Munnery he wrote and performed in a comedy series for BBC Radio 4 called The Adventures of John and Tony.

Hegley frequently performs live and is a regular at the Edinburgh Festival.  His stage act includes elements of poetry, music (he plays the mandolin and is often accompanied by a double bassist), comedy and references to Luton Town Football Club. He also likes to utilise audience participation in his shows, for example by having a dog drawing competition during the interval, or by asking his audience to try writing poetry themselves.

The University of Luton awarded him an honorary LL.D. in 2000, and he has also led creative writing courses at the university.

Hegley launched "Warning: May Contain Nuts", a project using comedy to increase awareness of mental illness. He performed these shows in 2010 with other performers, including comic Mackenzie Taylor, talking about mental illness.

Books
 Visions of the Bone Idol (Poems about Dogs and Glasses) illustrated by Linda Leatherbarrow (Little Bird Press 1984) ASIN: B0016ZKLU2
 The Brother-in-Law and Other Animals (Down the Publishing Company 1986)
 Poems for Pleasure (Hamlyn 1989)
 Glad to Wear Glasses (glad to have ears) illustrated by Linda Leatherbarrow (Andre Deutsch 1990) 
 Can I Come Down Now, Dad? (Methuen 1991)
 Five Sugars, Please (Methuen 1993)
 These Were Your Father's (Methuen 1994)
 Love Cuts (Methuen 1995)
 The Family Pack (Methuen 1997: incorporating The Brother-in-Law and Other Animals, Can I Come Down Now, Dad? and These Were Your Father's)
 Beyond our Kennel (Methuen 1998)
 Dog (Methuen 2000)
 My Dog is a Carrot (Walker Books 2002)
 The Sound of Paint Drying (Methuen 2003)
 Sit-Down Comedy (contributor to anthology, ed Malcolm Hardee & John Fleming) Ebury Press/Random House, 2003.  ; 
 Uncut Confetti (Methuen 2006)
 The Ropes: Poems To Hold On To   (editor with Sophie Hannah) (Diamond Twig 2008)
 The Adventures of Monsieur Robinet (Donut Press 2009)
 Stanley's Stick (Hodder's Children's Books 2012)
 Peace, Love & Potatoes (Serpent's Tail 2012)
 New & Selected Potatoes (Bloodaxe Books Ltd 2013)
 I am a Poetato: An A-Z of poems about people, pets and other creatures (Frances Lincoln Children's Books 2013)
 A Scarcity of Biscuit: Pieces drawn largely from the letters, life and laughter of John Keats (Caldew Press, 2021)

Discography
 Spare Pear/Mobile Home (1984) Double A-sided single of Peel session recordings, with the Popticians
 "I Saw My Dinner On TV" (1988) Single with the Popticians
 Saint and Blurry (1993) Poems and music
 Hearing with Hegley (1996) BBC audio-cassette taken from the radio series of the same name
 Family Favourites (2006) Poems and music

References

External links

 John Hegley's Word Wild Web Site
 
 Profile at the British Council website
 Hegley at the Guardian.

1953 births
Living people
English male poets
People from Islington (district)
People from Luton
Writers from Bristol
English male singer-songwriters
English people of French descent
Alumni of the University of Bradford
People associated with the University of Bedfordshire
Edinburgh Comedy Festival
English male comedians
20th-century English comedians
21st-century English comedians